This list of Grazia (India) cover models 2008–present is a catalog of women who have appeared on the cover of the Indian edition of Grazia magazine, starting with the magazine's first issue in April 2008.

2008

2009

2010

2011

2012

2013

2014

2015

2016

2017

2018

2019

2020

2021

2022

References

External links
 Grazia India covers - highheelconfidential.com

Lists of people by magazine appearance
Lists of models
2000s in India
2010s in India
Lists of 21st-century people